KLKY (96.1 FM, "U-Rock Radio") is a radio station broadcasting a classic rock music format. Licensed to Stanfield, Oregon, United States, the station is currently owned by Jacobs Radio Programming, LLC.

Translators
KLKY rebroadcasts its signal on the following translator:

References

External links

LKY
Classic rock radio stations in the United States
Umatilla County, Oregon
Radio stations established in 2005
2005 establishments in Oregon